Ge Manqi (born 13 October 1997 in Sanming, Fujian) is a Chinese female sprinter. The group of Ge Manqi, Yuan Qiqi, Wei Yongli and Liang Xiaojing ranked first in the women’s 4 × 100 metres relay in the Beijing IAAF Challenge on May 18, 2016.  She clocked 11.48 seconds for the 100m at 2016 National Track Championships in Chongqing, thus qualifying her for the 2016 Summer Olympics in Rio de Janeiro.

References

External links 
 
 
 
 
 

1997 births
Living people
Chinese female sprinters
Olympic athletes of China
Athletes (track and field) at the 2016 Summer Olympics
Asian Games medalists in athletics (track and field)
Asian Games silver medalists for China
Athletes (track and field) at the 2018 Asian Games
Medalists at the 2018 Asian Games
People from Sanming
Runners from Fujian
Athletes (track and field) at the 2020 Summer Olympics
Olympic female sprinters
21st-century Chinese women